British Shipbuilders (BS) was a public corporation that owned and managed the shipbuilding industry in Great Britain from 1977 through the 1980s. Its head office was at Benton House in Newcastle upon Tyne, England.

History

The corporation was founded as a result of the Aircraft and Shipbuilding Industries Act 1977, which nationalised 27 major shipbuilding and marine engineering companies in Great Britain. A further 6 ship repair companies and a further shipyard were also acquired by the corporation, with British Shipbuilders initially comprising 32 shipyards, 6 marine engine works and 6 general engineering plants. Collectively, British Shipbuilders accounted for 97% of the UK's merchant shipbuilding capacity, 100% of its warship-building capacity, 100% of slow speed diesel engine manufacturing and approximately 50% of ship-repair capacity. Harland & Wolff, the only shipbuilder based in Northern Ireland was deemed to be a special political case and remained out of the control of the British Shipbuilders' management, despite it also being in state ownership from 1977.

The same act nationalised the three large UK aerospace companies and grouped them in an analogous corporation, British Aerospace.

Leadership and organisation
The first Chairman of British Shipbuilders, serving from 1977 to 1980, was Admiral Sir Anthony Griffin. He was succeeded by Sir Robert Atkinson, who in turn was succeeded by Graham Day in 1984, Phillip Hares in 1986. The final operational chairman, John Lister, took office in 1987, continuing until 1989.

The company was initially organised into four operating divisions: Merchant, Naval, Ship-repair, Marine Engineering and General Engineering. This was restructured into five trading divisions in 1980: Merchant Shipbuilding, Warship-building, Engineering, Ship-repair and Offshore.

Privatisation
By the end of 1982, British Shipbuilders had closed half of its shipyards in an effort to reduce over-capacity. The terms of the British Shipbuilders Act 1983 then required the company to begin a process of privatising its remaining assets. The various divisions that had remained under integrated nationalised ownership were divested throughout the 1980s as the company wound up operations. The profitable warship-builders were sold off initially, with the merchant shipyards sold off or closed on a piecemeal basis, culminating in the sale of Govan Shipbuilders to Kværner in 1988 and Ferguson Shipbuilders to the privatised marine engine builder, Clark Kincaid, in January 1989. British Shipbuilders finally ceased active shipbuilding operations in 1989, with the closure of its last shipyards: North East Shipbuilders Ltd.'s Pallion and Southwick Shipyards at Sunderland. The remaining assets of North East Shipbuilders Ltd. were then privatised.

Abolition
British Shipbuilders continued to exist as a shell corporation in statute, in order to be accountable for any liabilities incurred during its operational history, until it was abolished in 2013 as part of the Government's 2010 public bodies reforms. From March 2013 any remaining liabilities of British Shipbuilders passed to the Department for Business, Innovation and Skills.

Assets subsumed by British Shipbuilders
The assets of the following companies vested in British Shipbuilders on 1 September 1977.

Shipbuilders and ship repairers
Ailsa Shipbuilding Company, Troon (acquired in 1978, merged with Ferguson Shipbuilders in 1981 to form Ferguson-Ailsa)
Appledore Shipbuilders, Appledore (merged with Harland & Wolff in 2020 to form Harland & Wolff (Appledore))
Austin & Pickersgill, Sunderland
Brooke Marine, Lowestoft
Cammell Laird Shipbuilders, Birkenhead
Clelands Shipbuilding Company, Wallsend
Falmouth Docks Company, Falmouth
Ferguson Shipbuilders, Port Glasgow (initially a subsidiary of Scott Lithgow, merged with Ailsa in 1981 to form Ferguson-Ailsa, then with Appledore Shipbuilders in 1986 to form Appledore-Ferguson)
Goole Shipbuilding & Repairing Company, Goole
Govan Shipbuilders, Govan, Glasgow (incorporating Scotstoun Marine Ltd)
Hall, Russell & Company, Aberdeen
Harland & Wolff, Belfast
River Thames Ship Repairers, Blackwall (later renamed Blackwall Engineering)
Robb Caledon Shipbuilders, (comprising Henry Robb, Leith and Caledon Shipbuilding & Engineering Company, Dundee)
Scott Lithgow, Greenock (comprising Scotts Shipbuilding and Engineering Company & Lithgows)
Smiths Dock Company, Middlesbrough
Sunderland Shipbuilders, Sunderland (incorporating William Doxford & Sons, Pallion)
Swan Hunter Shipbuilders Limited, Wallsend (later renamed Swan Hunter) - also incorporating John Readhead & Sons, South Shields, Wallsend Slipway and Engineering Company, Wallsend and Grangemouth Dockyard Company
Vickers Limited Shipbuilding Group, Barrow in Furness (renamed Vickers Shipbuilding and Engineering Limited - VSEL)
Vosper Thornycroft, Woolston and Portsmouth
Yarrow Shipbuilders (YSL), Scotstoun, Glasgow

Marine diesel engine manufacturers
Barclay Curle and Company, Whiteinch, Glasgow
George Clark & NEM, Sunderland
Hawthorn Leslie and Company, Hebburn
John G. Kincaid & Company, Greenock
Scotts’ Engineering Company Limited, Greenock

Note: Harland and Wolff, Belfast was state-owned but did not form part of British Shipbuilders.

Privatisation

Scott Lithgow (Offshore Division) - 1981 - individual operating companies dissolved, sold to Trafalgar House in 1984, closed 1993.
Brooke Marine (Merchant Division) - 1985 - management buyout. Ceased trading in 1992.
Vosper Thornycroft (Warship Division) - 1985 - management buyout, known as VT Group until 2008, now BAE Systems Surface Ships.
Yarrow Shipbuilders (Warship Division) - 1985 - sold to GEC-Marconi as Marconi Marine (YSL) then to BAE Systems as part of BAE Systems Marine, now BAE Systems Surface Ships.
VSEL (Warship Division) - 1986 - employee buyout, with Cammell Laird as a subsidiary. Acquired by GEC-Marconi in 1995 as part of Marconi Marine, then to BAE Systems as part of BAE Systems Marine, now BAE Systems Submarine Solutions.
Cammell Laird (Warship Division) - 1986 - as a subsidiary of VSEL, finished shipbuilding in 1993, continuing as ship-repair firm in different ownership. Cammell Laird resumed shipbuilding in 2012.
Ailsa Shipbuilders (Merchant Division) - 1986 - Ailsa split from merged BS subsidiary Ferguson-Ailsa and sold to Perth Corporation as Ailsa Perth Shipbuilders. Ceased shipbuilding in 1988.
Hall Russell (Warship Division) - 1986 - management buyout, later acquired by A&P Appledore International in 1989, closed 1992.
Swan Hunter (Warship Division) - 1987 - management buyout, entered receivership 1994, bought by Jaap Kroese. Ceased shipbuilding, 2006.
Govan Shipbuilders (Merchant Division) - 1988 - sold to Kværner as Kværner Govan, to GEC-Marconi 1999 as part of Marconi Marine then to BAE Systems as part of BAE Systems Marine, now BAE Systems Surface Ships.
Ferguson Shipbuilders (Merchant Division) - 1989 - demerged from Appledore-Ferguson sold to Clark Kincaid (HLD Group) in 1989.
Appledore Shipbuilders (Merchant Division) - 1989 - demerged from Appledore-Ferguson and sold to Langham Industries.
Clark Kincaid (Engineering Division) - 1989 - management buyout (HLD Group), later acquired by Kværner in 1990. Kværner Kincaid sold to Scandiaverken in 1999 and ceased manufacturing in 2000.

References

 
Defunct shipbuilding companies of the United Kingdom
Defence companies of the United Kingdom
Former defence companies of the United Kingdom
Defunct companies based in Tyne and Wear
Former nationalised industries of the United Kingdom
Vehicle manufacturing companies established in 1977
Vehicle manufacturing companies disestablished in 1989
1977 establishments in England
1989 disestablishments in England
2013 disestablishments in the United Kingdom
British companies disestablished in 1989
British companies established in 1977